Michal Ševčík (born 13 August 2002) is a Czech footballer who currently plays as a midfielder for FC Zbrojovka Brno.

Club career

FC Zbrojovka Brno
He made his professional debut for Zbrojovka Brno in the home match against Sigma Olomouc on 20 September 2020, which ended in a loss 2:4. After 66 minutes he replaced Jan Koudelka.

References

External links
 Profile at FC Zbrojovka Brno official site
 Profile at FAČR official site

2002 births
Living people
Czech footballers
FC Zbrojovka Brno players
Association football midfielders
Sportspeople from Třebíč
FC Vysočina Jihlava players
Czech Republic youth international footballers